Take Wing (foaled 1938) was an American Thoroughbred gelding racehorse claimed for $3,000  and who would then earn more than $160,000 for new owner Clyde Troutt and set a new North American record for a mile and three-sixteenths on turf.

Background
Take Wing was sired by Chicle who was the Leading sire in North America in 1929 and the Leading broodmare sire in North America in 1942. Take Wing's dam was a daughter of  My Play, a multiple race winning full brother to Man o' War.

Racing career
Trainer Clyde Troutt claimed Take Wing in early July 1942 and immediately won the Stars and Stripes Handicap at Arlington Park in a time that was just 1/5 of a second off the track record. For his win, the $3000 horse earned his new owner $8,600. Still racing at age nine, Take Wing set a new North American record of 1:55 1-5 for a mile and three-sixteenths on turf at Washington Park Racetrack in winning the Meadowland Handicap for the third time.

Retirement
Following his retirement from racing, Take wing was used as a lead pony for owner-trainer Clyde Troutt.

References

1938 racehorse births
Thoroughbred family 19-c
Racehorses bred in Kentucky
Racehorses trained in the United States
Horse racing track record setters